Jakub Rondzik (born 22 November 1986) is a Slovak football goalkeeper, who currently plays for 1. FK Příbram.

References

External links
 Guardian Football

1986 births
Living people
Slovak footballers
Association football goalkeepers
Czech First League players
1. FK Příbram players
Sportspeople from Košice